Estigmene testaceoflava is a species of moth of the family Erebidae. It was described by Rothschild in 1933. It is found in Senegal.

References

 Natural History Museum Lepidoptera generic names catalog

Spilosomina
Moths described in 1933